Tammuzh was a Tamil  Pandyan king in the Tamil cultural realm of ancient South India, who held his capital at Kuadam. The language and cultural term Tamil is an anglicised form of the native name Tamizhi தமிழ் (pronounced ).See also Legendary early Chola kings which shows similarity between early Chola kings and Ur kings list. The Pandyans had trading contacts with Ptolemaic Egypt and, through Egypt, with Rome by the 1st century CE. The 1st century Greek historian Nicolaus of Damascus met at Damascus the embassy sent by an Indian king "named Pandion or, according to others, Porus" to Caesar Augustus around 13 CE. The names of king and his kingdom have likely been conflated in Nicolaus' account.

References

Pandyan kings
1st-century Indian monarchs